Antoine Richard (born 8 September 1960) is a former athlete from France who mainly competed in the 100 metres. He was French 100 metre champion on 5 occasions, and also 200 metre winner in 1985.

He also won the French 60 metres title 5 times as well.

He competed for France at the 1980 Summer Olympics held in Moscow, Soviet Union where he ran in the 100 metres where he reached the Quarter final, but he won the bronze medal in the 4 x 100 metre relay with his team mates Pascal Barré, Patrick Barré and Hermann Panzo.

In 1983 he was 3rd place in the European cup 100metres in London. In 1985 he was European 60 metre silver medalist behind Mike McFarlane of the U.K.

International competitions

References

 

1960 births
Living people
Sportspeople from Fontainebleau
French male sprinters
Olympic athletes of France
Olympic bronze medalists for France
Olympic bronze medalists in athletics (track and field)
Athletes (track and field) at the 1980 Summer Olympics
Athletes (track and field) at the 1984 Summer Olympics
Medalists at the 1980 Summer Olympics
Athletes (track and field) at the 1983 Mediterranean Games
Athletes (track and field) at the 1991 Mediterranean Games
Mediterranean Games silver medalists for France
Mediterranean Games bronze medalists for France
Mediterranean Games medalists in athletics
20th-century French people
21st-century French people